El Águila (Alejandro Montoya) is a fictional character appearing in American comic books published by Marvel Comics. El Águila is patterned after the literary hero Zorro. His name is Spanish for "the eagle".

The character made its live-action debut in the Marvel Cinematic Universe television series She-Hulk: Attorney at Law, played by Joseph Castillo-Midyett.

Publication history
El Águila was introduced as a recurring adversary of Power Man and Iron Fist. Power Man and Iron Fist writer Mary Jo Duffy recounted his creation: 

El Águila made his first appearance in Power Man and Iron Fist #58 (August 1979). The character made several subsequent appearances in the title, including issues #58 (Aug. 1979), 65 (October 1980), 78 (February 1982), and 99-100 (February–March 1982). He appeared in Marvel Super Hero Contest of Champions #1-3 (June–August 1982) and Marvel Fanfare #3 (July 1982), and after an appearance in Marvel Comics Presents #9 (December 1988) a few years later he was not seen for some time. He finally made a return with a cameo appearance in G.L.A. #2 (July 2005), as well as Marvel Westerns: Outlaw Files (2006) and The New Avengers #18 (June 2006).

El Águila received an entry in the original The Official Handbook of the Marvel Universe #1, in The Official Handbook of the Marvel Universe Deluxe Edition #1, and in the Official Handbook of the Marvel Universe Master Edition #12.

Fictional character biography
Alejandro Montoya was born in Madrid, Spain, and later moved to America. Upon discovering his mutant powers, Alejandro decided to use his unique abilities as a swashbuckler and costumed crime fighter, taking up the mantle of El Águila (Spanish for "The Eagle"), an identity passed down by his ancestors. As El Águila, he preys upon drug dealers and criminals that take advantage of the poor and needy.  He is not a certified law authority and is wanted by authorities. Soon after launching his crime-fighting campaign against drug dealers, slumlords, brutal police, and other wrongdoers, Águila encountered Iron Fist, Power Man, and Misty Knight.

Águila aided Power Man and Iron Fist against female assassins out to kill Jeryn Hogarth. He also battled Hawkeye while investigating Cross Technological Enterprises when Hawkeye was serving as their head of security.

Águila teamed up with Power Man and Iron Fist to capture the Slasher, and fought the Constrictor. Alongside Colleen Wing and Misty Knight, he battled mercenaries working for Ward Meachum and fought Fera.

He aided Power Man, Iron Fist, Colleen Wing, Bob Diamond, and Rafael Scarfe in an attempt to rescue Misty Knight and D.W. Griffith from captivity by Ward Meachum's mercenaries.

Águila returned to Spain briefly on a request of his cousin Migdalia to save her village from the mutant Conquistador.

Águila was confirmed to have been depowered following the events of "M-Day". Though Alejandro now has no powers, he was still considered a "potential recruit" for the Initiative program because of his expertise in sword fighting and hand-to-hand combat.

Powers and abilities
Águila had the mutant power to generate electrostatic charges within his own body, and is able to discharge up to 100,000 volts through conductive metal. He most often uses his double-edged steel sword for this purpose, emulating his idol, Zorro. He is a skilled fencer with extraordinary swordsmanship skills, and an excellent hand-to-hand combatant and acrobat.

In other media
El Águila appears in the She-Hulk: Attorney at Law episode "The Retreat", portrayed by Joseph Castillo-Midyett. He is a participant in a spiritual retreat run by Emil Blonsky called Summer Twilight.

References

External links
 
 
 
 Aguila on Marvel Directory

Characters created by Dave Cockrum
Comics characters introduced in 1979
Fictional Spanish people
Fictional swordfighters in comics
Marvel Comics male superheroes
Marvel Comics martial artists
Marvel Comics mutants
Marvel Comics superheroes
Vigilante characters in comics